Askwith is a village and civil parish in the Harrogate district of North Yorkshire, England.

Askwith may also refer to:

 Askwith (Maine), a ghost town in Piscataquis County, Maine, United States
 Tom Askwith (1911–2001), a British Olympic rower and a colonial administrator in Kenya
 Mark Askwith (born 1956), a Canadian producer, writer, interviewer
 Robin Askwith (born 1950), an English film actor
 Wilfred Askwith (1890–1962), the 2nd Bishop of Blackburn and later the Bishop of Gloucester
 William Askwith (1843–1911). Archdeacon of Taunton
 George Askwith, 1st Baron Askwith (1861–1942), an English lawyer, civil servant and industrial arbitrator
 Richard Askwith, British journalist and author